Rudolf Horvath (born 7 December 1947) is a retired Austrian football defender who played for Austria. He also played for 1.Schwechater SC, SV Austria Salzburg, SK VÖEST Linz, SSW Innsbruck, FC Dornbirn 1913 and FC Blau Weiß Feldkirch.

External links

 
 

1947 births
Austrian footballers
Austria international footballers
Association football defenders
FC Red Bull Salzburg players
FC Wacker Innsbruck players
Living people
People from Oberpullendorf District
Footballers from Burgenland
Burgenland Croats